Il camorrista (English: The Professor) is a 1986 Italian noir-crime drama directed by Giuseppe Tornatore. His film debut, it is based on the true story of the Italian crime boss Raffaele Cutolo, and adapted from the novel by Giuseppe Marrazzo. The International version is shorter than the original Italian release.

Plot
In 1963, a young petty criminal, Raffaele Cutolo, kills a man who had harassed his sister Rosaria, and ends up in prison. 
Over the space of 10 years in Poggioreale prison in Naples, he becomes known as 'The Professor', a powerful, feared and respected figure. With his friends Alfredo Canale and Pasquale Zara "the animal", he creates the criminal organization "Nuova Camorra Organizzata". All run from Cutolo's prison cell, the organization grows and spreads until in the 70s it clashes with the old families of the Camorra, starting the War of the Camorra that will bleed all of South Italy in the 1970s and 1980s.

The earth trembles

In 1980, an earthquake strikes Naples and the Campania region. Fighting over the flood of government reconstruction money, the Camorrista war continues even more brutally than before. In 1981, the Red Brigades kidnap the regional Assessor Mimmo Mesillo (Ciro Cirillo in real life). Members of Mesillo's political party, the Christian Democrats, turn to the Professor to intervene, fearing that Mesillo will confess party secrets. In exchange, the Professor is promised freedom on mental illness grounds, and 3 billion in ransom. The assessor is freed, but taken into custody by the secret services rather than the police.

The fall of the Professor and the disappearance of NCO

The politicians do not respect the agreement and the Professor is put in the high-security prison of Asinara, by special decree of Italian president Sandro Pertini. This furthers the disintegration of the Professor's organization as his trusted men begin cooperating with the police. His sister Rosaria tries to counteract the damage, but to no avail. In the end, They kill Ciro, a trusted man who had sold out to politicians, by blowing him up in his car and burying his girlfriend inside a cement pylon. After this 2 killings, he drove insane thinking someday will be released by his men.

Cast

 Ben Gazzara as Franco, aka 'O Professore 'e Vesuviano
 Laura del Sol as Rosaria, Franco's sister
 Leo Gullotta as Commissario Iervolino
 Nicola Di Pinto as Alfredo Canale
 Luciano Bartoli as Ciro Parrella
 Maria Carta as Franco's mother
 Biagio Pelligra as Franco's father
 Franco Interlenghi as Don Saverio
 Piero Vida as Mimmo Mesillo
 Marzio Honorato as Salvatore
 Lino Troisi as Antonio "Malacarne" 
 Anita Zagaria as Anna, Franco's wife
 Mario Frera as Boss   
 Pino D'Angiò as Verzella 
 Giacomo Piperno as Quaestor  
 Marino Masè as Sapienza

Awards
 Nastro d'Argento Best New Director (Giuseppe Tornatore)
 David di Donatello Best Supporting Actor (Leo Gullotta)

References

External links 
 

1986 films
1980s Italian-language films
Italian crime drama films
Films directed by Giuseppe Tornatore
Biographical films about gangsters
Films about the Camorra
1980s prison films
Titanus films
1986 crime drama films
Films scored by Nicola Piovani
1980s Italian films